Doctor*Ology is a documentary television series which premiered its first five episodes on March 2, 2007 on the Discovery Channel. It is a comedic documentary, starring Leslie Nielsen, which describes the type of work done in various medical specialties.

Episodes 
 Episode 1: Traumatology. Original air date: Fri, March 2, 2007 at 8:30 PM (ET)/9 PM (PT)
 Episode 2: Cardiology. Original air date: Fri, March 2, 2007 at 9:00 PM (ET)/9:00 PM (PT)
 Episode 3: Neurology. Original air date: Fri, March 2, 2007 at 9:30 PM (ET)/10 PM (PT)
 Episode 4: Anesthesiology. Original air date: Fri, March 2, 2007 at 10:00 PM (ET)/10:30 PM (PT)
 Episode 5: Urology/Gynecology. Original air date: Fri, March 2, 2007 at 10:30 PM (ET)/11 PM (PT) 
 Episode 6: Ophthalmology. Original air date: Fri, March 9, 2007 at 8:30 PM (ET)/5:30 PM (PT) 
 Episode 7: Immunology. Original air date: Fri, March 16, 2007 at 8:30 PM (ET)/5:30 PM (PT) 
 Episode 8: Dermatology. Original air date: Fri, March 23, 2007 at 8:30 PM (ET)/5:30 PM (PT) 
 Episode 9: Hematology. Original air date: Fri, March 30, 2007 at 8:30 PM (ET)/5:30 PM (PT) 
 Episode 10: Gastroenterology. Original air date: Fri, April 6, 2007 at 8:30 PM (ET)/5:30 PM (PT) 
 Episode 11: Hepatology. Original air date: Fri, April 13, 2007 at 8:30 PM (ET)/5:30 PM (PT) 
 Episode 12: Otolaryngology. Original air date: Fri, April 20, 2007 at 8:30 PM (ET)/5:30 PM (PT) 
 Episode 13: Pulmonology. Original air date: Fri, April 27, 2007 at 8:30 PM (ET)/5:30 PM (PT)

External links 
Discovery page

Nielsen adds humour to med series
Discovery Channel Announces 14 New Series and Specials for Fall 2006 contains info on the show

2000s Canadian documentary television series
Discovery Channel (Canada) original programming
2007 Canadian television series debuts
2007 Canadian television series endings